American comedian, actor, author, director, and producer Bill Cosby is known for his performances in film, television, and stand-up comedy, and is perhaps most famous for his portrayal of the family patriarch Dr. Cliff Huxtable in the sitcom The Cosby Show (1984-1992).

He started his career as a standup comedian performing on television shows, night clubs and releasing many comedy albums. He got his start on television in the drama series I Spy (1965-1968) with Robert Culp. He then starred in The Bill Cosby Show, (1970-1972), The New Bill Cosby Show (1972), The Electric Company (1971-1973), and Cosby (1996-2000). He created, and voiced characters in the animated television projects Hey, Hey, Hey, It's Fat Albert (1969), and Fat Albert and the Cosby Kids (1972-1985). Cosby produced the spin-off sitcom A Different World, which aired from 1987 to 1993. He starred in The Cosby Mysteries from 1994 to 1995 and hosted Kids Say the Darndest Things from 1998 to 2000. he also hosted the TV special Sesame Street... 20 Years & Still Counting from 1989.

He made his film debut in Bob & Carol & Ted & Alice (1969) before starring opposite Robert Culp in Hickey & Boggs (1972). He then starred in Sidney Poitier's comedies Uptown Saturday Night (1974), and Let's Do it Again (1975). He then starred in the Peter Yates directed comedy Mother, Jugs & Speed (1976) alongside Raquel Welsh and Harvey Keitel and the Neil Simon ensemble comedy California Suite (1978) opposite Richard Pryor. He then wrote, produced and starred in the critically panned and box office bomb Leonard Part 6 (1987). He reunited with Poitier in Ghost Dad (1990), and appeared in minor roles in The Meteor Man (1993), Jack (1996), and Fat Albert (2004).

Filmography

Film

Sources: Turner Classic Movies and Internet Movie Database

Television

Sources: Internet Movie Database

References

External links
 

Filmography
American filmographies
Director filmographies
Male actor filmographies